Lepidodactylus aureolineatus, also known as the golden scaly-toed gecko or yellow-lined smooth-scaled gecko, is a species of gecko. It is endemic to the Philippines.

References

Lepidodactylus
Reptiles described in 1915